The Arco de Belén was built by Pedro Medina in 1775 and was part of the Convent and Church of Nuestra Señora de Belén located on Calle Acosta, it is a short tunnel that characterizes the location.

The old Convent of Nuestra Señora de Belén is the first baroque building in Old Havana. It was completed in 1718 and directed by the Order of Bethlemites.

The Belen Jesuit Preparatory School, moved from Havana to Miami after Fidel coup, was created in the mid 19th century in the facilities of the Convent of Belén of Havana.

Currently it houses a residence for the elderly financed by the Office of the Historian of Old Havana.

Gallery

See also
List of buildings in Havana

 Old Havana
 Royal Shipyard of Havana
 Colegio de Belén, Havana
 Havana

References

External links
ARCO DE BELÉN A PLAZA VIEJA
(1775) "Arcos de Belén" Calle Acosta y Compostela La Habana Vieja, Cuba
Archive of Historic Havana

Architecture in Havana
Architecture in Cuba
Buildings and structures in Havana
Streets in Havana